The 2022 Judo Grand Slam Antalya was held in Antalya, Turkey, from 1–3 April 2022.

Event videos
The event airs freely on the IJF YouTube channel.

Medal table

Men's events

Women's events

Prize money
The sums written are per medalist, bringing the total prizes awarded to 154,000€.

References

External links
 

2022 IJF World Tour
2022 Judo Grand Slam
Judo
Grand Slam 2022
Judo
Judo